Mount Hennessey is a mountain  north of Mount Tukotok in the Salamander Range of the Freyberg Mountains in Victoria Land, Antarctica. This topographical feature was first mapped by the United States Geological Survey from surveys and U.S. Navy air photos, 1960–64, and was named by the Advisory Committee on Antarctic Names for Raymond W. Hennessey, an aerographer at Hallett Station, Victoria Land, in 1957. This mountain lies situated on the Pennell Coast, a portion of Antarctica lying between Cape Williams and Cape Adare.

References

Mountains of Victoria Land
Pennell Coast